This is a list of public art in Solihull, in the West Midlands county of England. This list applies only to works of public art accessible in an outdoor public space. For example, this does not include artwork in museums.

Town Centre

Bickenhill

Chelmsley Wood

Dickens Heath

Elmdon

Olton

Shirley

Haslucks Green Road / Stratford Road

Shirley Park

References 

Solihull
Solihull